Quagering Island (also known as Flat Island) is an island off the south coast of Western Australia, located near Windy Harbour, and along with Sandy Island makes the Quagering Nature Reserve.

See also
D'Entrecasteaux National Park
The Cow and The Calf

References

Nature reserves in Western Australia
Islands of the South West (Western Australia)
D'Entrecasteaux National Park